Joseph Yokozuna Fatu (born March 18, 1993) is an American professional wrestler currently signed to WWE, where he performs on the SmackDown brand under the ring name Solo Sikoa. He is a member of The Bloodline and a former one-time NXT North American Champion. Fatu is a member of the Anoaʻi family of Samoan wrestlers.

Early life 
Fatu was born on March 18, 1993, in Sacramento, California, U.S. Fatu was born into the Anoaʻi family of Samoan wrestlers, which includes his father, Rikishi a WWE Hall of Famer, his older brothers, Jimmy Uso and Jey Uso, his cousin Roman Reigns, and many others including The Rock, Umaga, Yokozuna and the Wild Samoans. He played American football at American River College and Dickinson State University. After finishing college, Sikoa gave up football to pursue wrestling.

Professional wrestling career

Independent circuit (2018–2021) 
Debuting on April 29, 2018, Fatu would wrestle under the ring name Sefa Fatu. Fatu would regularly team with his cousins Jacob Fatu and Journey Fatu. On the 24th of August, 2018 Fatu teamed with his father Rikishi, and cousin Vincenzo losefa Parisi to defeat Brubaker, Gringo Loco and Jay Bradley at the Zelo Pro 1 Year Anniversary Show. Fatu debuted in Future Stars of Wrestling in December of 2018. On January 25, 2019, Fatu would win the FSW Nevada State Championship. He would hold the belt for 149 days until eventually losing to Hammerstone in June. In June of 2019, Fatu would wrestle his first match for Arizona Wrestling Federation. Fatu would defeat Watson to win the AWF Heavyweight Title in August of 2019. He would hold the belt for 418 days, losing it in January of 2020. In February of 2020, Fatu would defeat Carlito at Old School Championship Wrestling: Generation.

WWE (2021–present) 
On August 30, 2021, it was announced Fatu signed a contract with WWE. He was assigned to the development brand WWE NXT, making his debut on October 26, 2021 at Halloween Havoc as Solo Sikoa, interrupting a segment between the co-hosts Grayson Waller and L.A. Knight and subsequently attacked Waller, thus establishing himself as a face. He entered into a feud with Boa after his alter-ego attacked and choked him backstage on the December 28 episode of NXT. On the January 11, 2022 episode of NXT, Boa and Sikoa fought to a double countout and continued to brawl in the backstage area, resulting in Boa's alter-ego launching a fireball in Sikoa's face. This led to a No Disqualification Falls Count Anywhere match on the January 25 episode of NXT, where Sikoa defeated Boa after splashing him through a table. During the following months, he was involved in matches for the NXT North American Championship at Stand & Deliver (a five-way ladder match) and Spring Breakin' (a triple threat match), but was unsuccessful in winning the title. On the August 2 episode of NXT, Sikoa defeated Von Wagner in a falls count anywhere match after weeks of brawling, though suffered a knee injury in the process.

On September 3, at the Clash at the Castle premium event, Sikoa made his return from injury, interfering in the main event match between his cousin Roman Reigns and Drew McIntyre, helping Reigns retain the Undisputed WWE Universal Championship against McIntyre and aligning himself with The Bloodline, turning heel in the process. He made his main roster in-ring debut on the September 9 episode of SmackDown, losing to McIntyre by disqualification after Karrion Kross attacked McIntyre from behind. 

At NXT 2.0 One Year Anniversary Show on September 13, Sikoa made a surprise appearance and defeated Carmelo Hayes to win the NXT North American Championship. After defending the title three nights later at SmackDown against Madcap Moss, Sikoa was forced to vacate the title on the September 20 episode of NXT. During Reigns' Undisputed WWE Universal Championship defense against Logan Paul, Sikoa confronted Paul's younger brother, Jake Paul, who prevented The Usos from helping Reigns to retain his title by fighting them. Reigns later retained the title. At Survivor Series WarGames, Sikoa, along with The Bloodline, defeated the team of The Brawling Brutes (Sheamus, Ridge Holland and Butch), Drew McIntyre and Kevin Owens in a WarGames match in his pay-per-view debut.

Personal life 
On February 28, 2023, Fatu married Almia Williams. The couple have two sons named Zion and Zakhi Christopher.

Other media 
Sikoa is a playable character in the video game WWE 2K23, which marked his first debut in any WWE 2K game.

Fatu made his acting debut in Karyn Kusama's 2018 crime drama film, Destroyer, playing the role of Taz.

Filmography

Championships and accomplishments 
Arizona Wrestling Federation
AWF Heavyweight Championship (1 time)

ESPN
Best storyline of the year (2022) – 

Future Stars of Wrestling
FSW Nevada State Championship (1 time)

 Pro Wrestling Illustrated
 Faction of the Year (2022) – with The Bloodline
 Ranked No. 401 of the top 500 singles wrestlers in the PWI 500 in 2022

WWE
NXT North American Championship (1 time)

References

External links
 
 
 
 

1993 births
Living people
Anoa'i family
21st-century professional wrestlers
American male professional wrestlers
American people of Samoan descent
 NXT North American Champions
People from Sacramento, California
Professional wrestlers from California
Sportspeople from Sacramento, California
Sportspeople from San Francisco
American professional wrestlers of Samoan descent